The crown of Sancho IV, imperial crown or crown of the cameos is a royal crown which belonged to King Sancho IV of Castile. The crown was first mentioned by Alfonso X of Castile in his will on 21 January 1284.
Known to have been worn at least by kings Fernando III, Alfonso X, and Sancho IV, the crown was buried with the latter in the Cathedral of Toledo, and fortuitously discovered in 1948 when archaeologists were conducting a search for the tomb of Sancho II of Portugal. As such, it is one of very few extant and entirely unmodified medieval royal crowns in existence.

Description 

The crown, measuring some 57×8cm, is made up of eight 7×4.5cm gilded silver plates joined by hinges. At the top, in the centre of each plate, is a heraldic castle with three towers.

In the centre of each plaque is a precious stone or a cameo. Four have uncut sapphires; alternating with the sapphires are four cameos: two of Imperial Roman origin and two of Staufer or Southern Italian origin. The two roman cameos, dating back to the 1st century CE, depict portraits of Drusus the Younger and Queen Omphale, covered with the skin of the Lion of Nemea. The medieval italian cameos copy the style of ancient roman cameos, and depict two unidentified men.

History 
The crown was mentioned for the first time in the will of Alfonso X the Wise on 21 January 1284:

The three preserved copies of the will speak of crowns in plural. The use of cameos in Castilian royal crowns seems to not have been infrequent. Indeed, on 1 November 1362 Pedro I of Castile granted his testament in Seville, in which he wrote:

The treatment of the royal crowns and jewels was similar to the distribution of the family jewels of a father to his children. Sancho IV ordered his burial in the Cathedral of Toledo in 1285:

On the death of King Sancho IV on 25 April 1295, he was buried in a chapel of the Cathedral which the king himself had ordered be built, and to which he had transferred the remains of all other monarchs buried in Toledo. The tomb, probably a simple stone box, was soon replaced by a better one, ordered by his widow. The body was transferred to the new tomb in 1308, which possibly corresponds to the one that can be seen today to the right of the main altar. The body was moved again in the 16th century by order of Cardinal Cisneros, who placed them in their current location, where the crown was found.

Discovery 
The crown was found in 1948 during the search for the tomb of Sancho II of Portugal in the high altar area of Toledo Cathedral. Four sarcophagi were found: that of Alfonso VI of Castile, that of his son Sancho III of Castile, that of Sancho IV, and that of the infant Pedro, son of Alfonso XI of Castile. These sarcophagi had miraculously escaped the plundering of the comuneros and the Napoleonic troops. The body of Sancho IV was found wrapped in a quilt.

The crown is currently held in the cathedral of Toledo.

References

Kingdom of Castile
Individual crowns
Medieval crowns
Medieval European metalwork objects